What Do I Wish for Now? (Singles + Extras 1994–2004) is a compilation album by Aberdeen released in 2006, a year after the band's breakup.

The album contains all of Aberdeen's singles, B-sides and songs previously only featured on various artists albums in chronological order. For the release, the first three tracks (which were originally released together) were remastered. The booklet included with the album contains a history of the band (originally published on the Under the Radar website in 2002) and retrospective quotations from the band.

Track listing

 'Byron' (3:42)
 'Toy Tambourine' (3:22)
 'Fran' (2:55)
 'Fireworks' (3:14)
 'When It Doesn't Matter' (3:59)
 'Super Sunny Summer' (3:06)
 'Snapdragon' (3:45)
 'I Think I'm Falling' (3:42)
 'Marine Parade' (2:07)
 'She Never Understood' (5:30)
 'Sink or Float' (3:27)
 'Drive' (4:16)
 'The Boy Has Gone Away' (3:29)
 'Miss You Now You're Gone' (3:38)
 'Emma's House' (3:55)
 'Florida' (4:50)
 'Late Bloomr' (4:16)
 'Kyoto Death Song' (4:41)

References

External links
 History of the band included in the sleeve notes

Aberdeen (band) albums
2006 compilation albums